East Ellijay is a city in Gilmer County, Georgia, United States. The population was 546 at the 2010 census, down from 707 in 2000.

East Ellijay was originally the location of Fort Hetzel, one of the Cherokee removal forts built in 1838 to house the Cherokee people before sending them on the "Trail of Tears".

Geography
East Ellijay is bordered to the north and west by the city of Ellijay.

Georgia State Route 5/515, a four-lane bypass of Ellijay, runs the length of East Ellijay from north to south. U.S. Route 76 follows Routes 5/515 in the northern half of East Ellijay. Georgia State Route 52 runs southeast from East Ellijay  to Dahlonega.

The town lies on the southern border of the Chattahoochee National Forest. The Cartecay River, a tributary of the Coosawattee River, flows from east to west through East Ellijay.

Demographics

At the 2000 census, there were 707 people, 251 households and 159 families residing in the city. The racial makeup of the city was 68.60% White, 2.26% Native American, 2.97% Pacific Islander, 22.35% from other races, and 3.82% from two or more races. Hispanic or Latino of any race were 33.38% of the population.

There were 251 households, of which 31.1% had children under the age of 18 living with them, 43.0% were married couples living together, 11.6% had a female householder with no husband present, and 36.3% were non-families. 28.3% of all households were made up of individuals, and 15.1% had someone living alone who was 65 years of age or older. The average household size was 2.82 and the average family size was 3.18.

Age distribution was 24.5% under the age of 18, 16.0% from 18 to 24, 29.6% from 25 to 44, 17.3% from 45 to 64, and 12.7% who were 65 years of age or older. The median age was 30 years. For every 100 females, there were 120.9 males. For every 100 females age 18 and over, there were 127.2 males.

The median household income was $35,875, and the median family income was $38,594. Males had a median income of $20,341 versus $20,000 for females. The per capita income for the city was $13,934. About 14.6% of families and 19.5% of the population were below the poverty line, including 16.8% of those under age 18 and 15.9% of those age 65 or over.

References

Mooney, James. Myths of the Cherokee (1900, reprint 1995).

Cities in Georgia (U.S. state)
Cities in Gilmer County, Georgia